Teresa Lu (born 13 October 1987) is a Taiwanese professional golfer.

Lu played on the Ladies Asian Golf Tour in 2006 and 2007, on the LPGA Tour from 2006 to 2010 and on the LPGA of Japan Tour (JLPGA) since 2010. She won the Mizuno Classic in 2013, a tournament co-sanctioned by the LPGA and JLPGA. She picked up three additional wins on the JLPGA in 2014 and five in 2015. She also won twice as a non-member on the Ladies Asian Golf Tour in 2012. She finished second on the money list in both 2014 and 2015. Her highest position in world ranking is 19th, and currently she is the highest ranking woman golf player of Taiwan.

Professional wins (19)

LPGA Tour wins (1)

LPGA of Japan Tour wins (16)

Ladies Asian Golf Tour wins (2)

^ 2013 Mizuno Classic co-sanctioned by LPGA of Japan Tour and LPGA Tour.

China LPGA Tour wins (1)
2016 CTBC Ladies Open

Team appearances
Professional
International Crown (representing Chinese Taipei): 2014, 2016, 2018

References

External links

Taiwanese female golfers
LPGA of Japan Tour golfers
LPGA Tour golfers
Olympic golfers of Taiwan
Golfers at the 2016 Summer Olympics
Sportspeople from New Taipei
1987 births
Living people